Hugh Croxhale (fl. 1388–1416), of Shaftesbury, Dorset, was an English Member of Parliament, mayor and cloth merchant.

He married a woman named Alice; it is thought that they had one son.

He was a Member (MP) of the Parliament of England for Shaftesbury in September 1388 and September 1397.

He was Mayor of Shaftesbury Michaelmas in 1402–03 and 1415–16.

References

14th-century births
15th-century deaths
English MPs September 1388
15th-century English people
English MPs September 1397
Mayors of Shaftesbury